Teralatirus is a genus of sea snails, marine gastropod mollusks in the family Fasciolariidae.

Species
Species within the genus Teralatirus include:
 Teralatirus festivus (Melvill, 1910)
 Teralatirus funebris (Preston, 1907)
 Teralatirus roboreus (Reeve, 1845)

Species brought into synonymy or recombined include:
 Teralatirus cayohuesonicus (Sowerby III, 1878) accepted as Dolicholatirus cayohuesonicus (G. B. Sowerby II, 1878)
 Teralatirus ernesti (Melvill, 1910) accepted as Teralatirus roboreus (Reeve, 1845)
 Teralatirus noumeensis (Crosse, 1870) accepted as Crassicantharus noumeensis (Crosse, 1870)

References

Fasciolariidae